Marion Bridge (2001 pop.: 1711) is a Canadian rural community in Nova Scotia's Cape Breton Regional Municipality.

The community is named for the eponymous bridge that crosses the Mira River, Marion Bridge being approximately midway between the river's source in Grand Mira and its discharge point at Mira Gut. The current concrete highway bridge was constructed in 1982 as a replacement for an older bridge, which collapsed after an accident involving a snow plow.

Marion Bridge was made famous through a popular song written by Allister MacGillivray. Entitled Song for the Mira, it contains the refrain:
Can you imagine a piece of the universe,More fit for princes and kings?I'll trade you ten of your cities for Marion Bridge,
And the pleasure it brings.

The area is a setting for the 2002 film Marion Bridge.

Mira Gala

Marion Bridge plays host to the Mira Gala, an annual festival which is held every summer in late June/early July and lasts approximately 1 to 2 weeks.

The first Mira Gala was held in August 1975 -- a one-day event with activities for children throughout the afternoon and concluded with a pageant and dance in the evening. The following year, 1976, the date was moved to July and included Canada Day celebrations. Since then, the Gala grew in size and popularity, encompassing several days and requiring many community volunteers.

The 2023 Mira Gala is scheduled for June 30 to July 8.

Events held at the Mira Gala often include family square dances, a street parade, auctions, beef barbecues, music entertainment in the evenings, a canoe race, a bathtub race, dinner theatre, a strawberry social, an antique car show and a custom car show, a flea market, a roast beef dinner, hay rides, sports events, children's fun days, and a boat parade along the waterfront followed by fireworks on Canada Day.

References
 Marion Bridge on Destination Nova Scotia

 

Communities in the Cape Breton Regional Municipality
General Service Areas in Nova Scotia